Shortlands railway station is in Shortlands, in the London Borough of Bromley in south London. The station is located on the A222 road. Shortlands Junction, just west of the station, is where the Catford Loop Line joins the Chatham Main Line: the two lines are split into slow and fast pairs through the station, which consists of two island platforms on an embankment. The station is in London Travelcard Zone 4, and the station is managed by Southeastern and trains are operated by Southeastern and Thameslink.

History
It was originally opened by the West End of London and Crystal Palace Railway on 3 May 1858. The station was enlarged and rebuilt to its present form in 1892–94.

Shortlands Junction was remodelled in the 1950s to allow line speeds to be increased, and was remodelled again with the construction of Ravensbourne chord (a dive-under pair of lines) in 2002 to increase the capacity of the junction, as part of the work to enhance the existing network in conjunction with the opening of the first section of High Speed 1, the high-speed link to the Channel Tunnel.

Services 
Services at Shortlands are operated by Southeastern and Thameslink using ,  and  EMUs.

The typical off-peak service in trains per hour is:
 2 tph to  via 
 2 tph to London Blackfriars via 
 2 tph to 
 2 tph to  via 

In addition, the service to London Blackfriars is extended to and from  via .

Connections
London Buses routes 227, 358 and 367 serve the station.

References

External links 

Railway stations in the London Borough of Bromley
Former London, Chatham and Dover Railway stations
Railway stations in Great Britain opened in 1858
Railway stations served by Southeastern
Rail junctions in England
Railway stations served by Govia Thameslink Railway
1858 establishments in England